USS Chiwaukum (AOG-26) was a Mettawee-class gasoline tanker acquired by the U.S. Navy for the dangerous task of transporting gasoline to warships in the fleet, and to remote Navy stations.

Chiwaukum was launched 4 May 1944 by East Coast Shipyards, Inc., Bayonne, New Jersey, under a Maritime Commission contract; sponsored by Mrs. A. H. Moore; acquired by the Navy and commissioned 25 July 1944.

World War service  
 
Clearing Norfolk, Virginia, 23 September 1944, Chiwaukum sailed to load oil at Aruba, Netherlands West Indies, and reached Espiritu Santo, New Hebrides, 25 November.

She stood out of Espiritu Santo 2 December for the New Guinea area where she operated as a gasoline tanker until 18 January 1945 when she reported for similar duty in the Philippines. Departing Samar, Philippine Islands, 12 December 1945, Chiwaukum arrived at San Francisco, California, 9 February. She remained there until 17 April when she put out for Norfolk, arriving 16 May.

Post-war decommissioning 

Chiwaukum was decommissioned 31 May 1946 and transferred to Turkey 10 May 1948 and renamed TCG Akpınar. Final disposition: fate unknown.

Military awards and honors 

Chiwaukum’s crew was eligible for the following medals:
 American Campaign Medal
 Asiatic-Pacific Campaign Medal
 World War II Victory Medal
 Philippines Liberation Medal

References

External links 
 NavSource Online: Service Ship Photo Archive - AOG-26 Chiwaukum

 

Mettawee-class gasoline tankers
Type T1-M-A2 tankers of the United States Navy
Ships built in Bayonne, New Jersey
1944 ships
World War II auxiliary ships of the United States
Ships transferred from the United States Navy to the Turkish Navy